Evisa is a genus of moths of the family Noctuidae.

Species
 Evisa reisseri Wiltshire, 1952
 Evisa schawerdae Reisser, 1930

References
Natural History Museum Lepidoptera genus database
Evisa at funet

Hadeninae